Jürgen Dieter Paul Schmude (born 9 June 1936) is a German politician of the Social Democratic Party of Germany (SPD). 

He was born in Insterburg, East Prussia, Germany, (now Chernyakhovsk, Russia). He was a member of the German Parliament, the Bundestag, from 1969 to 1994. From 1978 to 1981, he was Federal German Minister for Education and Science and later Federal Minister of Justice from 1981 to 1982, then briefly Minister of the Interior in 1982. He is married and has two children.

External links
 https://web.archive.org/web/20070928010734/http://www.wehnerwerk.de/freundeskreis/schmude.html
 https://web.archive.org/web/20101026141927/http://www.ekd.de/vortraege/vortraege_schmude.html

1936 births
Living people
All-German People's Party politicians
People from East Prussia
People from Insterburg
Education ministers of Germany
Justice ministers of Germany
Members of the Bundestag for North Rhine-Westphalia
Members of the Bundestag 1987–1990
Members of the Bundestag 1983–1987
Members of the Bundestag 1980–1983
Members of the Bundestag 1976–1980
Members of the Bundestag 1972–1976
Members of the Bundestag 1969–1972
Members of the Bundestag for the Social Democratic Party of Germany